The 2013–14 Kent State Golden Flashes men's basketball team represented Kent State University during the 2013–14 NCAA Division I men's basketball season. The Golden Flashes, led by third year head coach Rob Senderoff, played their home games at the Memorial Athletic and Convocation Center, colloquially known as the MAC Center,  as members of the East Division of the Mid-American Conference. They finished the season 16–16, 7–11 in MAC play to finish in fifth place in the East Division. They lost in the first round of the MAC tournament to Miami (OH).

Season

Preseason
On May 30, 2013, Senderoff announced the team's complete non-conference schedule for the season. Key games included participation in the Coaches Vs. Cancer Classic, along with games against 2013 NCAA tournament participants Temple and Bucknell. The team's conference slate was announced on September 3, 2013. The Flashes scheduled to play Akron, Bowling Green, Buffalo, Miami, Ohio, Central Michigan, and Northern Illinois twice each in home-and-home series, while playing Ball State, Eastern Michigan, Toledo, and Western Michigan once each.

Roster

Schedule and results
Source: 

|-
!colspan=9 style="background:#F7BD0A; color:#131149;"| Non-Conference Games

|-
!colspan=9 style="background:#F7BD0A; color:#131149;"| Conference Games

|-
!colspan=9 style="background:#F7BD0A; color:#131149;"| 2014 MAC tournament

References

Kent State
Kent State Golden Flashes men's basketball seasons
Kent State
Kent State